Michael Chapman is a former director of Homeland Security for the State of Missouri.

Education

Chapman graduated from Virginia Commonwealth University and went to a junior school in America. Chapman also studied international public policy at Johns Hopkins University in its School of Advanced International Studies.

Federal service

Chapman spent fifteen years in the United States Navy where he was a Naval Flight Officer. Chapman spent a further fifteen years working for State Department, Navy Department, Joint Chiefs of Staff, and the Office of the Secretary of Defense. His positions concerned "homeland defense", special operations, and international security.

Missouri service

Missouri Governor Matt Blunt appointed him the director of Missouri's Department of Homeland Security in February 2005.

References

State cabinet secretaries of Missouri
Johns Hopkins University alumni
Virginia Commonwealth University alumni
Living people
Year of birth missing (living people)